Sainte-Hedwidge is a municipality in Quebec, Canada. The community is also known as Sainte-Hedwidge-de-Roberval.

Demographics
Population trend:
 Population in 2011: 824 (2006 to 2011 population change: 0.5%)
 Population in 2006: 820
 Population in 2001: 843
 Population in 1996: 863
 Population in 1991: 879

Private dwellings occupied by usual residents: 362 (total dwellings: 576)

Mother tongue:
 English as first language: 0%
 French as first language: 98.8%
 English and French as first language: 0%
 Other as first language: 1.2%

See also 
Le Domaine-du-Roy Regional County Municipality
Lac Saint-Jean, a waterbody
Rivière du Castor (rivière à l'Ours)
Ovide River
Petite rivière à l'Ours (rivière à l'Ours) - South
Rivière aux Iroquois
Deuxième bras des Iroquois, un cours d'eau
Rivière à la Chasse (lac Saint-Jean)
Ouiatchouaniche River

References

Municipalities in Quebec
Incorporated places in Saguenay–Lac-Saint-Jean